Pseudozobellia is a Gram-negative and aerobic genus of bacteria from the family of Flavobacteriaceae with one known species (Pseudozobellia thermophila). Pseudozobellia thermophila has been isolated from the alga Ulva fenestrata.

References

Flavobacteria
Bacteria genera
Monotypic bacteria genera
Taxa described in 2009